Crateroscelis is a songbird genus of the Australasian "warbler" family (Acanthizidae). It was formerly placed in the Pardalotidae, which are now considered monotypic to genus. The common name of these birds is mouse-warblers.

It contains the following species:
 Rusty mouse-warbler, Crateroscelis murina
 Bicolored mouse-warbler, Crateroscelis nigrorufa
 Mountain mouse-warbler, Crateroscelis robusta

References
 Del Hoyo, J.; Elliot, A. & Christie D. (editors). (2006). Handbook of the Birds of the World. Volume 12: Picathartes to Tits and Chickadees. Lynx Edicions. 

 
Acanthizidae
Bird genera
Taxonomy articles created by Polbot